Mark Lucgjonaj (born 30 August 1986) is an Albanian poet and professor.

Biography
Mark Lucgjonaj was born in Podgorica to an Albanian family from Malësi. He finished elementary school and high school in his hometown Tuzi to continue studies in University of Pristina in Kosovo. Mark studied Albanian language and literature, and later he finished master's degree in Luigj Gurakuqi University in Shkodër. He is the nephew of notable Gheg Albanian writer Nokë Sinishtaj.

In June 2014 Lucgjonaj published his first poetry book in Albanian Zhurma e Mendimeve (The Noise of Thoughts) and in Montenegrin Buka Misli.

References

External links
http://www.goodreads.com/author/show/8308526.Mark_Lucgjonaj

Albanian Roman Catholics
Albanians in Montenegro
Albanian male poets
20th-century Albanian poets
1986 births
Montenegrin poets
Montenegrin male writers
Living people
Writers from Podgorica
20th-century Albanian educators
21st-century Albanian educators
Malsorë
21st-century Albanian poets
20th-century male writers
21st-century male writers